Paul Chervinko (July 23, 1910 – June 3, 1976) was a Major League Baseball catcher for parts of two seasons with the Brooklyn Dodgers (1937–1938).  He was a native of Trauger, Pennsylvania.

Chervinko was an excellent defensive player who just couldn't hit well enough to stay in the big leagues.  Behind the plate he made only one error in 102 chances for a fielding percentage of .990.  At bat, however, he was just 11-for-75 (.147) with five runs batted in and one run scored in 42 total games.

During his time with Brooklyn he was surrounded by some quite notable people.  His manager was Hall of Famer Burleigh Grimes, and some of his teammates were future Hall of Famers as well: outfielder Heinie Manush, pitcher Waite Hoyt, and shortstop Leo Durocher.  Also on the team was All-Star infielder Cookie Lavagetto, who would later gain fame in the 1947 World Series.

Chervinko died in Danville, Illinois at the age of 65.

External links

The Deadball Era

1910 births
1976 deaths
Baseball players from Pennsylvania
Bloomington Bloomers players
Brooklyn Dodgers players
Columbus Red Birds players
Danville Dodgers players
Dayton Ducks players
Elmira Red Wings players
Major League Baseball catchers
Minor league baseball managers
Montreal Royals players
Newport Dodgers players
People from Westmoreland County, Pennsylvania
Reading Brooks players